The 19th TVyNovelas Awards is an Academy of special awards to the best soap operas and TV shows. The awards ceremony took place on May 8, 2001 in Mexico D.F. The ceremony was televised in Mexico by El canal de las estrellas.

Jacqueline Bracamontes, Alfredo Adame, Raúl de Molina, Adriana Riveramelo, Lorena Herrera, Toño de Valdés, Ernesto Laguardia and Montserrat Olivier hosted the show. Abrázame muy fuerte won 9 awards including Best Telenovela, the most for the evening. Other winners Primer amor, a mil por hora won 7 awards and Amigos x siempre, Locura de amor, Mi destino eres tú and Ramona won one each.

Summary of awards and nominations

Winners and nominees

Telenovelas

Others

Special Awards 
 Best Sports Program: Televisa Deportes
 Best Sports Commentator: Toño de Valdés
 Best Foreign Telenovela: Yo soy Betty, la fea
 Best Foreign Actress: Ana María Orozco for Yo soy Betty, la fea
 Best Foreign Actor: Jorge Enrique Abello for Yo soy Betty, la fea

Missing 
People who did not attend ceremony wing and were nominated in the shortlist in each category:
 Helena Rojo (In her place received by Lucy Orozco )

References 

TVyNovelas Awards
TVyNovelas Awards
TVyNovelas Awards
TVyNovelas Awards ceremonies